Columbitech, founded in 2000, provides wireless security to secure mobile devices, with support for WLAN and public networks, including 3G, 4G and WiMAX. The company is headquartered in Stockholm, Sweden with offices in New York City.

Columbitech Mobile VPN
The Columbitech mobile VPN provides remote network access to field mobility users, corporate WLAN users and remote workers – mobilizing the enterprise. The solution is encrypted on standards-based Wireless Transport Layer Security (WTLS) and holds a FIPS 140-2 certification.

The technology is utilized in the retail industry to meet PCI DSS requirements, and in other industries where mobile devices are used over wireless networks.

References

Computer security companies
Information technology companies of Sweden
Mobile technology companies
Companies based in Stockholm
Computer companies established in 2000
Electronics companies established in 2000